Several institutions are known as St John's Theological College:

 St John's College, Auckland (formally The College of St John the Evangelist ), New Zealand
 St John's Theological College, Melbourne
 St John's Theological College, Perth
 St John's Theological College, Suva, Fiji
 St John's Theological College, Mthatha, South Africa

See also:

 Saint John's College (disambiguation)